Isorana is a rural municipality in Madagascar. It belongs to the Isandra district, which is a part of Haute Matsiatra Region. The population of the commune was 15,472 in 2018.

Primary and junior level secondary education are available in town. The majority 80% of the population of the commune are farmers, while an additional 10% receives their livelihood from raising livestock. The most important crop is rice, while other important products are maize and cassava. Services provide employment for 10% of the population.

Roads
The National road 42 links the town to Fianarantsoa.

Rivers
The municipality is crossed by the Isandra river in its center, the Matsiatra in the North-East, and the Ranomaitso in the South.

References

Populated places in Haute Matsiatra